Kallistos I (? – August 1363) was the Ecumenical Patriarch of Constantinople for two periods from June 1350 to 1353 and from 1354 to 1363.  Kallistos I was an Athonite monk and supporter of Gregory Palamas.  He died in Constantinople in 1363.

Life
Nothing is known of Callistus' early life. He was a disciple of Gregory Palamas and Gregory of Sinai. He lived at Mount Athos for 28 years and was a monk at the Skete of Magoula near Philotheou Monastery at Mount Athos.

In his "Hagiography of Gregory of Sinai", he mentions two devotees, Jakov of Serres and Romylos of Vidin, then living and writing in Serbia. He also founded the Monastery of St. Mamas at Tenedos, a small island near the Dardanelles.

Patriarchate
Kallistos was elected to the throne of the see of Constantinople in June 1350, succeeding Isidore I. In 1351, he convened a synod in Constantinople that finally established the Orthodoxy of Hesychasm.

Kallistos I and the ecumenical patriarchs who succeeded him mounted a vigorous campaign to have the Palamite doctrine accepted by the other Eastern patriarchates as well as all the metropolitan sees under their jurisdiction. However, it took some time to overcome initial resistance to the doctrine.

One example of resistance was the response of the Metropolitan of Kiev who, upon receiving tomes from Kallistos that expounded the Palamist doctrine, rejected the new doctrine vehemently and composed a reply refuting it.

According to Martin Jugie, contemporary historians depict Kallistos as a "doctrinaire and brutal man whose persecuting zeal it was necessary to restrain."

In 1353, Kallistos refused to crown Matthew Kantakouzenos, son of emperor John VI Kantakouzenos, as emperor with his father and, as a result, was deposed. After his deposition, Callistus returned to Mount Athos. In 1354, after John VI abdicated, Kallistos returned as patriarch. After his return, Callistus worked to strengthen the administration of the patriarchate. He reorganized the parish system of churches under the surveillance of a patriarchal exarch. He also strove to strengthen patriarchal control over various Orthodox church jurisdictions, even to the extent of excommunicating Stephen Uroš IV Dušan of Serbia, for establishing the Serbian archbishop as an independent patriarch.

In 1355, Patr. Callistus of Constantinople wrote to the clergy of Trnovo that those Latins who had baptized by single immersion should be re-baptized. He called the baptism by one immersion most improper and full of impiety. His view was based on the Apostolic canons which clearly state that those baptized by one immersion are not baptized and should be re-baptized.

Death
Patr. Callistus died in 1363 while he was en route to Serres as a member of the embassy of emperor John V Palaiologos seeking aid from Helena of Bulgaria, Empress of Serbia against the Ottoman Empire.

While Callistus was Patriarch, he once passed through Mount Athos on his way to Serbia and met Maximos the Hut-Burner, who greeted the Patriarch in a humorous manner, "This old man will never see his old lady again." This turned out to be a prophecy of how Callistus would never see Constantinople ("his old lady") again, since he would die before being able to return there. Maximos then bid farewell to Callistus by chanting, "Blessed are the blameless in the way" (from Psalm 118, a funeral psalm). Kallistos subsequently journeyed on to Serbia, where he then died. (Note that the "Callistus" in this account is often confused with Callistus II of Constantinople, who reigned as Patriarch in 1397, after the death of Maximos of Kafsokalyvia.)

Works
With another monk, Ignatius Xanthopoulos, with whom he had developed a life-long friendship at Mount Athos, Callistus composed the important Century, a tract of 100 sections on the ascetical practices of the Hesychastic monks; it was incorporated in the Philokalia of Nicodemus the Hagiorite and had a great influence on Orthodox spirituality. In the Philokalia, the full title of the work is An exact rule and method with God's help for those who choose to live as hesychasts and monastics by the monks Kallistos and Ignatios Xanthopoulos, including testimonies from the saints.

See also
Palamism
Hesychast controversy

Bibliography
Gones, Demetrios V. To Syngraphikon Ergon tou Oikomenikou Patriarchou Kallistou A'. Athenai: Ethnikon kai Kapodistriakon Panepistemion Athenon, Theologike Schole 1979, 1980. First Thus. Softcover. Near Fine Thesis submitted to the Theological school st the University of Athens. Contents: Vioi hagion, Homiliai, Euchai. Apolesthenta, amphivallomena kai kakos apodothenta kai apodidomena eis ton Kalliston erga. 377p. [32] leaves of plates : facsimiles, bibliography, index

References

Deposed.

|-

1363 deaths
14th-century patriarchs of Constantinople
Year of birth unknown
People associated with Philotheou Monastery
Disciples of Gregory of Sinai
Hesychasts